The Departmental Council of Ille-et-Vilaine is the deliberative assembly of the Ille-et-Vilaine department in the region of Brittany. It consists of 54 members (general councilors) from 27 cantons.

The President of the General Council is Jean-Luc Chenut.

Vice-Presidents 
The President of the Departmental Council is assisted by 15 vice-presidents chosen from among the departmental advisers. Each of them has a delegation of authority.

See also 

 Ille-et-Vilaine
 General councils of France

References

External links 

 Departmental Council of Ille-et-Vilaine (official website)

Ille-et-Vilaine
Ille-et-Vilaine